Skiumarkha is a census village in the Leh district of Ladakh, India. It is located in the Likir tehsil.

Located in the Markha valley, the census village comprises Skiu-Kaya and Markha villages. Skiu-Kaya, in turn, is a grouping of two adjacent villages, Skiu and Kaya.

Demographics
According to the 2011 census of India, Skiumarkha has 43 households. The effective literacy rate (i.e. the literacy rate of population excluding children aged 6 and below) is 60.41%.

References 

Villages in Likir tehsil